Woolshed is a rural locality in the City of Ipswich, Queensland, Australia.

Geography

Unlike other places in City of Ipswich, Woolshed lies within the Lockyer Creek catchment, not the Bremer River catchment.  Most of the terrain is sloped as Woolshed occupies a section of the Little Liverpool Range.  The area is undeveloped with few roads and little land clearing undertaken.

The Woolshed Creek Reserve was established in Woolshed as part of the Ipswich Enviroplan to preserve habitat suitable for koalas.

References

City of Ipswich
Localities in Queensland